Ruta chalepensis is a species of flowering plant in the Rutaceae family known by the common name fringed rue. It is native to Eurasia and North Africa. It has been found elsewhere as an introduced species. It is a perennial herb growing up to 80 centimeters tall. The leaves are compound, each divided into several segments which are subdivided into smaller leaflets. The inflorescence is a cluster of flowers, each with four or five bright yellow petals with rolled, fringed edges. The fruit is a textured capsule which is divided into pointed lobes.

In traditional herbal medicine, the plant is used as for a number of ailments, such as fever and inflammation.

Ruta chalepensis is the original source of the chemical compound chalepensin.

References

External links

Jepson Manual Treatment
Photo gallery

chalepensis
Medicinal plants
Flora of Malta